The Feudal Barony of MacDuff is a Scottish Feudal Barony in Macduff, Scotland, contained mostly within the boundaries of the Town of Macduff, in the Banff and Buchan area of Aberdeenshire, Scotland. Clan MacDuff traces origins to the historic, Lowland, Scottish Duff Clan.  William Shakespeare's MacBeth has always played a role in the legend of Clan MacDuff, as few can determine the line between The Duff Family history and historical fiction. This ambiguity worked to the benefit of future MacDuff Barons, who were able to prove they were descended from the first Duff to receive a charter in Northeast Scotland. In 1404 David Duff received the charter, in Aberdeenshire, from Robert III of Scotland.  In 1759, William Duff was granted the historic Celtic Title of “Fife”, further tying the Duffs of  Northeast Scotland, with their ancient Lowland ancestors - the original Earls of Fife from the 11th century. William Duff had five sons - the eldest, James, would become the 2nd Earl Fife and the 1st Baron of MacDuff.  James invested heavily in the village of Doune, or “Down”, across the River Deveron from Banff. He built a harbor there in 1760, which quickly became more successful than the harbor at neighboring Banff, which had been established much earlier. In 1783 a charter was granted by King George III, changing the name from Doune to Macduff in his favor and, although a lesser title than Earl, bestowing on him the dignity of the 1st Baron of Macduff.

Barons of MacDuff

James Duff, 2nd Earl Fife, 1st Baron of MacDuff  
 Born: 1729

Died: 1809

Preceded by: N/A

Succeeded by: Alexander Duff

Seat: Duff House

Alexander Duff, 3rd Earl Fife, 2nd Baron of MacDuff 
Born: 1731

Died: 1811

Preceded by: James Duff

Succeeded by: James Duff

Seat: Duff House

James Duff, 4th Earl Fife, 3rd Baron of MacDuff 
Born: 1776

Died: 1857

Preceded by: Alexander Duff

Succeeded by: James Duff

Seat: Duff House

James Duff, 5th Earl Fife, 4th Baron of MacDuff 
Born: 1814

Died:  1857

Preceded by: James Duff

Succeeded by: Alexander Duff

Seat: Duff House

Alexander Duff, 1st Duke of Fife, 5th Baron of MacDuff 
Born: 1849

Died: 1912

Preceded by: James Duff

Succeeded by: Lady Alexandra Duff

Seat: Mar Lodge

Princess Alexandra, 2nd Duchess of Fife, 6th Baroness of MacDuff 
Born: 1891

Died: 1959

Preceded by: Alexander Duff

Succeeded by: Alexander Ramsay of Mar

Seat: Mar Lodge

Alexander Ramsay of Mar, 7th Baron of MacDuff 

Born: 1919

Died: 2000

Preceded by: Lady Alexandra Duff

Succeeded by: James Mark Domesek

Seat: Mar Lodge

James Mark Domesek, 8th Baron of MacDuff 
Born: unknown

Died: unknown

Preceded by: Alexander Ramsay of Mar

Succeeded by: Eric Cotton Dexter

Eric Cotton Dexter, 9th Baron of MacDuff 

Born: 1971

Died: N/A

Preceded by: James Mark Domesek

Succeeded by: N/A

J.C. Dexter, Younger of MacDuff 
Born: 2000

Died N/A

Heir Apparent to the Barony of MacDuff

References 

Noble titles
Barony of MacDuff
Barony of MacDuff
Barony of MacDuff
Barony of MacDuff
MacDuff
Lists of British nobility
Lists of nobility
Nobility of the United Kingdom
MacDuff
Barony of MacDuff
Scotland,MacDuff